Rukerd (also Romanized as Rūkerd; also known as Rood Kurd, Rūd Kerd, Rūgerd, Rūkerd-e Khenāmān, and Rūkīrd) is a village in Khenaman Rural District, in the Central District of Rafsanjan County, Kerman Province, Iran. At the 2006 census, its population was 52, in 19 families.

References 

Populated places in Rafsanjan County